Ass is the fifth studio album by British rock band Badfinger, and their last album released on Apple Records. The opening track, "Apple of My Eye", refers to the band leaving the label to begin its new contract with Warner Bros. Records.

The cover artwork, showing a donkey chasing a distant carrot, alludes to Badfinger's feelings that they had been misled by Apple. The cover was painted by Grammy Award-winning artist Peter Corriston, who would later create album covers for Led Zeppelin (Physical Graffiti) and the Rolling Stones (Some Girls, Tattoo You).

Recording and release delays

Although recordings for the album began as early as 1972, shortly after the release of Straight Up, Ass was not released until 26 November 1973 in the US and 8 March 1974 in the UK. The album was originally delayed because of production quality, as the band attempted to produce the album themselves after producer Todd Rundgren departed the project with just two songs recorded. After a first version of the album was rejected by the label, Apple engineer Chris Thomas was hired as a first-time producer to improve the overall recordings and make new track selections.

The album was further delayed when a disagreement surfaced between Apple and Badfinger's management on publishing copyrights. Half of the tracks on Ass were written by Joey Molland. Molland never signed a publishing agreement with Apple Music, unlike his three bandmates, who had signed such a publishing agreement when still in The Iveys. Instead, Molland assigned the individual copyrights of his songs that were selected for Badfinger albums to Apple Music after production. Badfinger's then-manager, Stan Polley, attempted to use Apple's lack of a publishing agreement with Molland to block release of the album; he told Molland not to agree to any individual assignments, and Molland obliged. Eventually, to circumvent Polley's strategy, writing credits for all songs on the US and UK album releases of Ass were credited by Apple to "Badfinger", not to the actual author of the song.

Release

Ass peaked at number 122 on the Billboard 200 in the US. The single "Apple of My Eye" only peaked at number 102 on Billboards "Bubbling Under" chart in America. The release of Ass caused the band's first album for Warner Bros. to be delayed. After the album was deleted from the Apple catalog a large number of heavily discounted copies  appeared in cut-out bins at US record stores during the 1970s. The original CD version released in the 1990s is now rare because it was re-released only in a few countries (UK, Canada, and Japan) for a limited period. The album was remastered and re-released in 2010.

A few weeks prior to the 1990s CD release a few Abbey Road Studios mastered C90 cassettes of Ass were distributed to a handful of music industry people. It appears from the track listing on these cassettes that Ass was originally planned to have five bonus tracks: "Dreaming", "Piano Red", "Rock & Roll", "Regular", and "Do You Mind". This idea was clearly scrapped, as "Do You Mind" was the only one included on that version of the album.  (A different version of that song appeared on the 2010 remaster.)

Ass was the Apple Records label's last original album release that was not by an ex-Beatle.

Track listing

Original release
Side one
"Apple of My Eye" (Pete Ham) – 3:06
"Get Away" (Joey Molland) – 3:59
"Icicles" (Molland) – 2:32
"The Winner" (Molland) – 3:18
"Blind Owl" (Tom Evans) – 3:00

Side two
"Constitution" (Molland) – 2:58
"When I Say" (Evans) – 3:05
"Cowboy" (Mike Gibbins) – 2:37
"I Can Love You" (Molland) – 3:33
"Timeless" (Ham) – 7:39

1992 CD reissue
Bonus track
"Do You Mind" (Molland) – 3:36

2010 remastered album
Bonus tracks
"Do You Mind" [alternate version] (Molland) – 3:15
"Apple of My Eye" [early mix] (Ham) – 3:02
"Blind Owl" [alternate version] (Evans) – 2:52
"Regular" (Molland) – 2:39
"Timeless" [alternate version] (Ham) – 5:27

Supplementary bonus tracks with digital download
 "Get Away" [alternate version] (Molland) – 3:32
 "When I Say" [alternate version] (Evans) – 3:14
 "The Winner" [alternate version] (Molland) – 3:15
 "I Can Love You" [alternate version] (Molland) – 3:37
 "Piano Red" [previously unreleased] (Ham) – 3:31

Personnel
Pete Ham – lead and rhythm guitars, keyboards, lead (1, 10) and backing vocals 
Tom Evans – bass guitar, lead (5, 7) and backing vocals
Joey Molland – lead (2–4, 6, 9) and backing vocals, rhythm and lead guitars, keyboards 
Mike Gibbins – drums, lead (8) and backing vocals

Charts

References

1973 albums
Badfinger albums
Apple Records albums
Albums produced by Chris Thomas (record producer)
Albums produced by Todd Rundgren
Albums recorded at Apple Studios
Albums recorded at Morgan Sound Studios
Albums with cover art by Peter Corriston
Albums recorded at Olympic Sound Studios